Sir Hugh Shakespear Barnes  (14 July 1853 – 15 February 1940) was an English administrator in British India. He served as Chief Commissioner of Baluchistan several times during the 19th century, and was Lieutenant-Governor of Burma from 1903 to 1905.

Early life and education
Barnes was born in Shahjahanpur, Uttar Pradesh, to James Ralph Barnes, a member of the British Indian Civil Service, and Mary Jane Thompson. His maternal great-grandfather, George Nesbitt Thompson, (1753–1831), was private secretary to Warren Hastings. His mother's brother was Sir Rivers Thompson, Lieutenant-Governor of Bengal, while his father's brother George Carnac Barnes, Commissioner of the Cis-Sutlej states. He was educated at Malvern College. His brother, Herbert Curie Barnes, served as Private Secretary to the Chief Commissioner of Burma.

Career
Hugh Barnes joined the Indian Civil Service in 1874, after placing atop the entrance examination. He was appointed Chief Commissioner of Baluchistan in 1891 (twice), and served further terms in 1896–1899 and 1899–1900. In 1899, he was appointed Foreign Secretary to the Government of India. It was in this capacity he attended the January 1903 Delhi Durbar, and it fell to him to initiate the main ceremony by officially asking the Viceroy to declare the Durbar open.

It was announced in August 1902 that Barnes was to be appointed Lieutenant-Governor of Burma in succession to Sir Frederick Fryer, whose term ended in early 1903. Barnes served in Burma from April 1903 until May 1905, in which year he became a Member of the Council of India.

He was appointed a Knight Commander of the Order of the Star of India (KCSI) in the 1903 Durbar Honours.

Personal life
Barnes married Winifred Strachey, daughter of John Strachey, another Indian civil servant and a member of the prominent Strachey family. So many members of the Strachey family served in India that they were known jokingly as the "Strachey government." Barnes' daughter, Mary Barnes Hutchinson, was to become a writer and member of the Bloomsbury Group.

References

1853 births
1940 deaths
People from Shahjahanpur
People educated at Malvern College
Chief Commissioners of Baluchistan
Administrators in British Burma
Knights Commander of the Order of the Star of India
Knights Commander of the Royal Victorian Order
Indian Civil Service (British India) officers